Togwoteeus biceps is a species of harvestmen in a monotypic genus in the family Sclerosomatidae from the United States.

References

Harvestmen
Monotypic arachnid genera